The 1995–96 New York Rangers season was the franchise's 70th season. During the regular season, the Rangers posted a 41–27–14 record, which placed them second in the Atlantic Division and gave them a berth in the 1996 Stanley Cup playoffs. In the first round of the playoffs, New York defeated the Montreal Canadiens in six games to advance to the Eastern Conference Semifinals, where the team lost to the Pittsburgh Penguins in five games.

Regular season
The Rangers were shorthanded a league-high 495 times during the regular season, and tied the Ottawa Senators and Tampa Bay Lightning for fewest short-handed goals scored (6).

Final standings

Schedule and results

|- align="center" bgcolor="#FFBBBB"
| 1 || 7 || @ Hartford Whalers || 2 - 0 || 0-1-0
|- align="center" bgcolor="#CCFFCC"
| 2 || 11 || Winnipeg Jets || 6 - 4 || 1-1-0
|- align="center" bgcolor="#CCFFCC"
| 3 || 14 || @ Toronto Maple Leafs || 2 - 0 || 2-1-0
|- align="center" bgcolor="#FFBBBB"
| 4 || 16 || Hartford Whalers || 7 - 5 || 2-2-0
|- align="center" bgcolor="#CCFFCC"
| 5 || 17 || @ New York Islanders || 5 - 1 || 3-2-0
|- align="center" bgcolor="#CCFFCC"
| 6 || 20 || @ Buffalo Sabres || 3 - 1 || 4-2-0
|- align="center" bgcolor="#FFBBBB"
| 7 || 22 || Ottawa Senators || 4 - 2 || 4-3-0
|- align="center" bgcolor="#CCFFCC"
| 8 || 24 || Vancouver Canucks || 5 - 2 || 5-3-0
|- align="center" bgcolor="white"
| 9 || 26 || @ Tampa Bay Lightning || 4 - 4 OT || 5-3-1
|- align="center" bgcolor="#CCFFCC"
| 10 || 29 || Toronto Maple Leafs || 3 - 2 || 6-3-1
|- align="center" bgcolor="#CCFFCC"
| 11 || 31 || @ San Jose Sharks || 5 - 3 || 7-3-1
|-

|- align="center" bgcolor="#FFBBBB"
| 12 || 2 || @ Los Angeles Kings || 5 - 3 || 7-4-1
|- align="center" bgcolor="#FFBBBB"
| 13 || 3 || @ Mighty Ducks of Anaheim || 7 - 4 || 7-5-1
|- align="center" bgcolor="#CCFFCC"
| 14 || 6 || Calgary Flames || 4 - 2 || 8-5-1
|- align="center" bgcolor="#CCFFCC"
| 15 || 8 || Tampa Bay Lightning || 5 - 4 || 9-5-1
|- align="center" bgcolor="#CCFFCC"
| 16 || 10 || New York Islanders || 4 - 1 || 10-5-1
|- align="center" bgcolor="#CCFFCC"
| 17 || 11 || @ Hartford Whalers || 4 - 1 || 11-5-1
|- align="center" bgcolor="white"
| 18 || 14 || @ St. Louis Blues || 1 - 1 OT || 11-5-2
|- align="center" bgcolor="#FFBBBB"
| 19 || 16 || @ Chicago Blackhawks || 3 - 1 || 11-6-2
|- align="center" bgcolor="#FFBBBB"
| 20 || 17 || @ Winnipeg Jets || 6 - 3 || 11-7-2
|- align="center" bgcolor="#CCFFCC"
| 21 || 21 || Pittsburgh Penguins || 9 - 4 || 12-7-2
|- align="center" bgcolor="#CCFFCC"
| 22 || 22 || @ Pittsburgh Penguins || 4 - 3 || 13-7-2
|- align="center" bgcolor="#FFBBBB"
| 23 || 25 || @ Detroit Red Wings || 2 - 0 || 13-8-2
|- align="center" bgcolor="white"
| 24 || 27 || New Jersey Devils || 1 - 1 OT || 13-8-3
|- align="center" bgcolor="#CCFFCC"
| 25 || 29 || Buffalo Sabres || 5 - 3 || 14-8-3
|-

|- align="center" bgcolor="#CCFFCC"
| 26 || 1 || Colorado Avalanche || 5 - 3 || 15-8-3
|- align="center" bgcolor="#CCFFCC"
| 27 || 2 || @ Ottawa Senators || 4 - 2 || 16-8-3
|- align="center" bgcolor="#CCFFCC"
| 28 || 4 || Mighty Ducks of Anaheim || 5 - 1 || 17-8-3
|- align="center" bgcolor="white"
| 29 || 6 || Chicago Blackhawks || 5 - 5 OT || 17-8-4
|- align="center" bgcolor="#CCFFCC"
| 30 || 8 || Detroit Red Wings || 2 - 1 OT || 18-8-4
|- align="center" bgcolor="white"
| 31 || 9 || @ Montreal Canadiens || 2 - 2 OT || 18-8-5
|- align="center" bgcolor="#CCFFCC"
| 32 || 11 || Dallas Stars || 3 - 2 || 19-8-5
|- align="center" bgcolor="#CCFFCC"
| 33 || 13 || Boston Bruins || 4 - 2 || 20-8-5
|- align="center" bgcolor="#FFBBBB"
| 34 || 15 || @ Buffalo Sabres || 5 - 4 || 20-9-5
|- align="center" bgcolor="#FFBBBB"
| 35 || 16 || @ Washington Capitals || 3 - 2 || 20-10-5
|- align="center" bgcolor="#CCFFCC"
| 36 || 18 || Washington Capitals || 3 - 0 || 21-10-5
|- align="center" bgcolor="#CCFFCC"
| 37 || 21 || @ Philadelphia Flyers || 2 - 1 || 22-10-5
|- align="center" bgcolor="white"
| 38 || 22 || Hartford Whalers || 3 - 3 OT || 22-10-6
|- align="center" bgcolor="#CCFFCC"
| 39 || 26 || Ottawa Senators || 6 - 4 || 23-10-6
|- align="center" bgcolor="#CCFFCC"
| 40 || 28 || @ Vancouver Canucks || 3 - 2 || 24-10-6
|- align="center" bgcolor="#CCFFCC"
| 41 || 30 || @ Edmonton Oilers || 8 - 3 || 25-10-6
|- align="center" bgcolor="#FFBBBB"
| 42 || 31 || @ Calgary Flames || 3 - 1 || 25-11-6
|-

|- align="center" bgcolor="#CCFFCC"
| 43 || 3 || Montreal Canadiens || 7 - 4 || 26-11-6
|- align="center" bgcolor="white"
| 44 || 5 || @ Washington Capitals || 4 - 4 OT || 26-11-7
|- align="center" bgcolor="#CCFFCC"
| 45 || 10 || San Jose Sharks || 7 - 4 || 27-11-7
|- align="center" bgcolor="#CCFFCC"
| 46 || 13 || @ Philadelphia Flyers || 4 - 0 || 28-11-7
|- align="center" bgcolor="white"
| 47 || 14 || St. Louis Blues || 3 - 3 OT || 28-11-8
|- align="center" bgcolor="#CCFFCC"
| 48 || 22 || Los Angeles Kings || 3 - 1 || 29-11-8
|- align="center" bgcolor="white"
| 49 || 24 || Philadelphia Flyers || 4 - 4 OT || 29-11-9
|- align="center" bgcolor="#CCFFCC"
| 50 || 27 || @ Boston Bruins || 5 - 3 || 30-11-9
|- align="center" bgcolor="white"
| 51 || 31 || @ Dallas Stars || 1 - 1 OT || 30-11-10
|-

|- align="center" bgcolor="#FFBBBB"
| 52 || 3 || @ Colorado Avalanche || 7 - 1 || 30-12-10
|- align="center" bgcolor="#CCFFCC"
| 53 || 6 || @ New York Islanders || 4 - 2 || 31-12-10
|- align="center" bgcolor="#CCFFCC"
| 54 || 8 || New York Islanders || 6 - 2 || 32-12-10
|- align="center" bgcolor="#FFBBBB"
| 55 || 10 || @ New Jersey Devils || 3 - 0 || 32-13-10
|- align="center" bgcolor="#CCFFCC"
| 56 || 11 || @ Tampa Bay Lightning || 6 - 2 || 33-13-10
|- align="center" bgcolor="white"
| 57 || 15 || Montreal Canadiens || 2 - 2 OT || 33-13-11
|- align="center" bgcolor="#CCFFCC"
| 58 || 17 || @ Ottawa Senators || 2 - 1 OT || 34-13-11
|- align="center" bgcolor="#FFBBBB"
| 59 || 18 || @ Pittsburgh Penguins || 4 - 3 OT || 34-14-11
|- align="center" bgcolor="#FFBBBB"
| 60 || 22 || New York Islanders || 5 - 3 || 34-15-11
|- align="center" bgcolor="#CCFFCC"
| 61 || 24 || @ Florida Panthers || 4 - 0 || 35-15-11
|- align="center" bgcolor="#FFBBBB"
| 62 || 27 || Washington Capitals || 5 - 3 || 35-16-11
|- align="center" bgcolor="#FFBBBB"
| 63 || 28 || Boston Bruins || 3 - 1 || 35-17-11
|-

|- align="center" bgcolor="white"
| 64 || 1 || Buffalo Sabres || 3 - 3 OT || 35-17-12
|- align="center" bgcolor="white"
| 65 || 4 || New Jersey Devils || 2 - 2 OT || 35-17-13
|- align="center" bgcolor="#FFBBBB"
| 66 || 7 || @ Tampa Bay Lightning || 5 - 2 || 35-18-13
|- align="center" bgcolor="#CCFFCC"
| 67 || 9 || @ Washington Capitals || 6 - 1 || 36-18-13
|- align="center" bgcolor="white"
| 68 || 13 || Florida Panthers || 3 - 3 OT || 36-18-14
|- align="center" bgcolor="#FFBBBB"
| 69 || 16 || @ Montreal Canadiens || 4 - 2 || 36-19-14
|- align="center" bgcolor="#FFBBBB"
| 70 || 19 || Edmonton Oilers || 4 - 1 || 36-20-14
|- align="center" bgcolor="#CCFFCC"
| 71 || 23 || @ Boston Bruins || 5 - 4 || 37-20-14
|- align="center" bgcolor="#FFBBBB"
| 72 || 24 || Pittsburgh Penguins || 8 - 2 || 37-21-14
|- align="center" bgcolor="#CCFFCC"
| 73 || 27 || Florida Panthers || 3 - 0 || 38-21-14
|- align="center" bgcolor="#CCFFCC"
| 74 || 31 || @ New York Islanders || 4 - 1 || 39-21-14
|-

|- align="center" bgcolor="#CCFFCC"
| 75 || 2 || New Jersey Devils || 3 - 1 || 40-21-14
|- align="center" bgcolor="#FFBBBB"
| 76 || 4 || @ Philadelphia Flyers || 4 - 1 || 40-22-14
|- align="center" bgcolor="#CCFFCC"
| 77 || 5 || Philadelphia Flyers || 3 - 1 || 41-22-14
|- align="center" bgcolor="#FFBBBB"
| 78 || 7 || @ New Jersey Devils || 4 - 2 || 41-23-14
|- align="center" bgcolor="#FFBBBB"
| 79 || 8 || Florida Panthers || 5 - 3 || 41-24-14
|- align="center" bgcolor="#FFBBBB"
| 80 || 10 || Washington Capitals || 4 - 1 || 41-25-14
|- align="center" bgcolor="#FFBBBB"
| 81 || 12 || Tampa Bay Lightning || 3 - 2 || 41-26-14
|- align="center" bgcolor="#FFBBBB"
| 82 || 14 || @ Florida Panthers || 5 - 1 || 41-27-14
|-

Playoffs

Key:  Win  Loss

Player statistics
Skaters

Goaltenders

†Denotes player spent time with another team before joining Rangers. Stats reflect time with Rangers only.
‡Traded mid-season. Stats reflect time with Rangers only.

Transactions
 July 31, 1995 – Doug Lidster was traded by the St. Louis Blues to the New York Rangers in exchange for Jay Wells.

Draft picks
New York's picks at the 1995 NHL Entry Draft in Edmonton, Alberta, at the Edmonton Coliseum.

See also
 1995–96 NHL season

References

New York Rangers seasons
New York Rangers
New York Rangers
New York Rangers
New York Rangers
1990s in Manhattan
Madison Square Garden